Nur Land (Polish: ziemia nurska), named after the town (now a village) of Nur, was an administrative unit (ziemia) of the Duchy of Mazovia, Kingdom of Poland and the Polish–Lithuanian Commonwealth. With its capital in Nur, it belonged to Masovian Voivodeship. 

In the Middle Ages, Nur was one of the most important towns of Mazovia, and the seat of a starosta. In 1377, during a meeting of Mazovian dukes, which took place in Sochaczew, boundaries of the Land of Nur were established. It covered 3655 km2, and was divided into three counties: Kamienczyk (area 2141 km2), Nur (area 1001 km2) and Ostrow Mazowiecka (area 512 km2). 

In 1526, Nur Land was annexed into the Kingdom of Poland, and until the Partitions of Poland, it belonged to Masovian Voivodeship. Local sejmiks took place at Nur.

Sources 
 History of Nur Land and County of Ostrow Mazowiecki
 Adolf Pawiński: Polska XVI wieku pod względem geograficzno-statystycznym. T. 5: Mazowsze. Warszawa: Księgarnia Gebethnera i Wolffa, 1895

Ziemias